Harry Keller Hoch (January 9, 1887 – October 26, 1981) was a professional baseball player and lawyer. He pitched in Major League Baseball for the Philadelphia Phillies and St. Louis Browns in 1908, 1914, and 1915. Hoch was 5 feet, 10 inches tall and weighed 165 pounds.

Baseball career
Hoch was born in Woodside, Delaware, in 1887. He attended Kutztown State Normal School (now Kutztown University of Pennsylvania), where he played baseball in 1905 and 1906, and is a member of that school's Athletics Hall of Fame.  He started his professional baseball career in 1907 with the Tri-State League's Wilmington Peaches. In 36 games, he had a win–loss record of 12–18. The following season, he made his major league debut for the Philadelphia Phillies on April 16, 1908. Hoch started three games for Philadelphia and went 2–1 with a 2.77 earned run average. However, he did not stay on the roster and spent most of the season in the Tri-State League, where he went 11–15.

Hoch played in the New York State League from 1910 to 1913. He won a career-high 17 games in 1910 while pitching for the Elmira Colonels, and then he won 16 games in 1911. In August 1913, Hoch was purchased by the American League's St. Louis Browns. He appeared in 15 games for them in 1914 and went 0–2 with a 3.00 ERA. In 1915, his ERA rose to 7.20, and he made his last MLB appearance on June 24.

Law career
Unlike many ballplayers of his era, Hoch was educated and attended Dickinson Law School in the offseason. He was nicknamed "Schoolmaster" because of this. After Hoch's baseball career ended in 1915, he became a lawyer in Delaware and practiced until 1962. Among his clients was inventor Alfred Lawson.

Hoch died in Lewes, Delaware, in 1981 and was buried in Townsend Cemetery.

References

External links

1887 births
1981 deaths
Major League Baseball pitchers
Philadelphia Phillies players
St. Louis Browns players
Wilmington Peaches players
Harrisburg Senators players
Elmira Colonels players
Binghamton Bingoes players
Louisville Colonels (minor league) players
Baseball players from Delaware
Delaware lawyers
Kutztown Golden Bears baseball players
Dickinson School of Law alumni
20th-century American lawyers